Roberto Dotti (born 25 July 1961) is a retired cyclist from Italy. He won the UCI Motor-paced World Championships in 1985 and finished in second place the year before.

References

1961 births
Living people
Italian male cyclists
Place of birth missing (living people)
Sportspeople from Como
Cyclists from the Province of Como